Inositol 1,4,5-trisphosphate receptor, type 2, also known as ITPR2, is a protein which in humans is encoded by the ITPR2  gene.  The protein encoded by this gene is both a receptor for inositol triphosphate and a calcium channel.

See also
 Inositol trisphosphate receptor

References

Further reading

External links
 

Ion channels